Vrije may refer to:

 Vrije Universiteit Amsterdam is a university in Amsterdam, Netherlands
 Vrije Universiteit Brussel is a Flemish university located in Brussels, Belgium 
 Brugse Vrije was a castellany in the county of Flanders
 Het Vrije Volk was a Dutch social-democratic daily newspaper